John T. Johnson may refer to:

John Telemachus Johnson (1788–1856), U.S. Representative from Kentucky
John T. Johnson (Oklahoma judge) (1856–1935), associate justice of the Oklahoma Supreme Court

See also
John Johnson (disambiguation)